This article gives an overview of liberalism and radicalism in Romania. It is limited to liberal parties with substantial support, mainly proved by having had a representation in parliament. The sign ⇒ denotes another party in this scheme. For inclusion in this scheme it is not necessary for a party to have actually labeled itself as a liberal party.

Background 

Liberalism has been one of the major political forces in Romania since the Wallachian Revolution of 1848, which was later mainly organized in the centre-right historical National Liberal Party (PNL), especially at governmental level. 

As of July 2022, the contemporary National Liberal Party (PNL) is the head of the Romanian government with its incumbent Prime Minister, Nicolae Ciucă, with elected members in both houses of the Romanian Parliament (more specifically 80 in the Chamber of Deputies and 37 in the Senate) as well as in the European Parliament (where it is the largest Romanian party, having 10 MEPs out of 33 allocated for Romania). At European Parliament level, the PNL is a member party of European People's Party (EPP) and thereby part of the European People's Party Group (EPP Group).

The National Liberal Party (PNL) has historically had many spin-offs (or breakaway factions) and mergers alike with other centre-right parties (many of which were former breakaway factions returning to the main party). For example, the Alliance of Liberals and Democrats (ALDE) was such a notable relatively recent spin-off/breakaway faction. Furthermore, the Romanian ALDE was a junior partner in a coalition government along the Social Democratic Party (PSD) between 2017 and 2019, before merging again in the PNL in early 2022.

History

Precursors
1822: Ionică Tăutu, representing a group of low-ranking boyars in Moldavia, proposed a constitutional project with republican and liberal principles
1834: Ion Câmpineanu leads the liberal opposition to Russian influence in Wallachia's National Assembly
1840: Mitică Filipescu led a radical, carbonari-inspired conspiracy in Wallachia
1840: Mihail Kogălniceanu published the short-lived Dacia Literară, a Romantic nationalist and liberal magazine, engendering a literary society
1843: Nicolae Bălcescu and others led the Frăţia radical conspiracy in Wallachia
1845: Radical students from both Wallachia and Moldavia founded Societatea Studenţilor Români (the "Society of Romanian Students") in Paris
1848: The unsuccessful Moldavian revolution, during which Moldavian liberals issued a Petition-Proclamation
1848: The liberal-minded Blaj Assemblies in Transylvania, in the context of revolutions inside the Austrian Empire
1848: The Wallachian revolution – liberals formed a Provisional Government in Bucharest, and were divided over the issue of land reform, with a radical current forming around Bălcescu
1856: The liberal current formed the majority in Partida Naţională, a loose group supporting the union of the Danubian Principalities
1859: After the union, liberals formed a distinct faction in the Parliament of Romania
1864: Domnitor Alexandru Ioan Cuza established a personal regime, in order to pass liberal legislation against mounting opposition
1866: Mainstream liberals supported Cuza's removal from the throne; a faction of the liberal current opposed to the new constitution formed the Moldavian-based Fracţiunea liberă şi independentă, influenced by Simion Bărnuțiu and led by Nicolae Ionescu

National Liberal Party (PNL) 

 1875: The liberal current organised itself in the National Liberal Party (Partidul Naţional-Liberal), led by Ion Brătianu
 1884: A faction formed the Radical Party, led by C.A. Rosetti and George Panu
 1899: The National Liberal Party absorbs the right-wing of the Romanian Social-Democratic Workers' Party
 1918: The Peasants' Party absorbs a left-wing tendency in the National Liberal Party formed around Constantin Stere
 1929: A faction formed the ⇒ National Liberal Party-Brătianu
 1931: A faction formed the Liberal Democratic Party, which remained unsuccessful. The same year a majority of the Brătianu party returned in the National Liberal Party
 1938: The rest of the Brătianu party returned in the National Liberal Party
 1938: The party is banned by King Carol II
 1944: The party resumed its activities
 1944: A faction formed the ⇒ National Liberal Party-Tătărescu
 1947: The Brătianu faction dissolves itself
 1990: A party claiming the National Liberal legacy is founded by Radu Câmpeanu
 1990: A youth faction of the National Liberal Party formed the ⇒ Liberal Party Youth Wing
 1991: A faction formed the ⇒ National Liberal Party-Democratic Convention
 1995: The ⇒ Liberal party 1993 merged into the National Liberal Party, the ⇒ National Liberal Party-Câmpeanu seceded from the party
 1998: The party absorbed the ⇒ Civic Alliance Party
 2002: The Alliance for Romania (Alianţa pentru România) merged into the National Liberal Party
 2003: The Union of Right-Wing Forces (Uniunea Forţelor de Dreapta) and the ⇒ National Liberal Party-Câmpeanu merged into the party

National Liberal Party-Brătianu (PNL-B) 

 1929: A breakaway faction of the ⇒ National Liberal Party (PNL) formed the National Liberal Party–Brătianu, supporting Gheorghe I. Brătianu as its president;
 1931: Most of the party returned to the ⇒ National Liberal Party (PNL);
 1938: The party reunited with the ⇒ National Liberal Party (PNL).

National Liberal Party–Tătărescu (PNL-T) 

 1944: A faction of the ⇒ National Liberal Party (PNL) formed the National Liberal Party–Tătărescu (PNL-T) which was presided initially by former Prime Minister and PNL member Gheorghe Tătărescu (who was also previously a member of the National Renaissance Front, FRN) and then, subsequently, by Petre Bejan towards the end of its political existence;
 1946: The party ran in that year's Romanian general election with the Romanian Communist Party (PCR) and the Ploughmen's Front (FP), being part of the People's Democratic Front (FDP) which at that time ran as the Bloc of Democratic Parties (BPD). The election was fraudulently won by the Communists. The party was briefly part of the Communist-dominated governmental coalition led by Petru Groza between 1946 until 1947;
 1948: The party decided to ran separately in that year's Romanian legislative election, in opposition towards the Bloc of Democratic Parties (BPD). It entered the unicameral Parliament (or, as it was now back then, the Great National Assembly) with a very feeble number of elected representatives, more specifically 7. For that year's legislative election, the party leadership switched from Tătărescu to Bejan and remained as such during the upcoming years;
 1950: The party ceased its political activity, being banned (or dissolved) by the Romanian Communist Party (PCR).

From National Liberal Party Youth Wing (PNL-AT) to Liberal Party 1993 (PL '93) 

 1990: A youth faction of the ⇒ National Liberal Party (PNL) formed the National Liberal Party Youth Wing (PNL-AT) in opposition to then leadership of the party which was presided by Radu Câmpeanu;
 1992: The party was renamed Liberal Party and was led by Horia Rusu;
 1993: The Liberal Party merged with the ⇒ National Liberal Party-Democratic Convention (PNL-CD) and the Group for Moral and Political Reforms into the Liberal Party 1993 (PL '93), joined by a faction of the ⇒ Civic Alliance Party (PAC);
 1995: The party merged into the ⇒ National Liberal Party (PNL).

Civic Alliance Party (PAC) 

 1991: A section of the Civic Alliance (PAC) non-governmental organization established the Civic Alliance Party, led by Nicolae Manolescu;
 1993: A faction joined the ⇒ Liberal Party 1993;
 1998: The party merged into the ⇒ National Liberal Party (PNL).

National Liberal Party-Democratic Convention (PNL-CD)

 1991: A faction of the ⇒ National Liberal Party (PNL) formed the National Liberal Party-Democratic Convention (PNL-CD), in opposition to Radu Câmpeanu, then incumbent PNL president, who withdrew the party from the Romanian Democratic Convention (CDR) shortly before the 1992 Romanian general election;
 1993: The party merged into the ⇒ Liberal Party 1993.

National Liberal Party-Câmpeanu (PNL-C) 

 1995: A faction of the ⇒ National Liberal Party (PNL) centered around former PNL president, Provisional Council of National Unity (CPUN) vice-president, and Senate vice-president Radu Câmpeanu formed the National Liberal Party-Câmpeanu (PNL-C);
 2003: The party merged into the ⇒ National Liberal Party (PNL).

Alliance for Romania (ApR) 

 1997: A faction of the ⇒ Party for Social Democracy of Romania (PDSR) formed the Alliance for Romania (ApR) presided by former FDSN Minister of Foreign Affairs Teodor Meleșcanu;
 2002: The party merged into the ⇒ National Liberal Party (PNL).

Democratic Liberal Party (PDL) 

 1990: The National Salvation Front (FSN) was founded;
 1992: Conflict broke between FSN leaders Ion Iliescu and Petre Roman which led to the break-away of the wing supporting Iliescu known as the Democratic National Salvation Front (FDSN);
 1993: Under the leadership of former FSN Prime Minister Petre Roman, the FSN changed its name to the Democratic Party (PD);
 2004: The National Liberal Party (PNL) and Democratic Party (PD) formed the ⇒ Justice and Truth Alliance (DA) and joined a government coalition after the 2004 legislative and presidential elections;
 2006: The Justice and Truth Alliance (DA) was disbanded and a faction of the National Liberal Party (PNL) formed the ⇒ Liberal Democratic Party (PLD) presided by former PNL president and former FSN Prime Minister Theodor Stolojan;
 2007: The Liberal Democratic Party (PLD) merged with the Democratic Party (PD) and formed ⇒ the Democratic Liberal Party (PDL);
 2014: The Democratic Liberal Party (PDL) merged into the ⇒ National Liberal Party (PNL).

Alliance of Liberals and Democrats (ALDE) 

 2014: A faction of the ⇒ National Liberal Party (PNL) formed the Liberal Reformist Party (PLR);
 2015: The Liberal Reformist Party (PLR) merged into the Alliance of Liberals and Democrats (ALDE);
 2022: The party merged into ⇒ National Liberal Party (PNL).

Save Romania Union (USR) 

 2015: The Save Bucharest Union (USB) was founded;
 2016: The Save Bucharest Union founded a nationwide party, called Save Romania Union (USR);
 2018: Former Prime Minister Dacian Cioloș founded the Freedom, Unity and Solidarity Party (PLUS);
 2020: PLUS and Save Romania Union merged into USR PLUS one year after they formed an electoral alliance with the same name;
 2021: USR PLUS returned to the name Save Romania Union (USR);
 2022: A faction centered around former USR president Dacian Cioloș seceded from ⇒ USR and founded a new party called Renewing Romania's European Project (REPER), in opposition to the current USR acting/ad interim president Cătălin Drulă.

Force of the Right (FD) 

 2021: A faction of the ⇒ National Liberal Party (PNL) led by former Prime Minister and PNL president Ludovic Orban formed the Force of the Right (FD) in opposition to current PNL presidency officially led by Nicolae Ciucă and unofficially by Klaus Iohannis.

Presidents of the National Liberal Party (1875–present)

See also
 History of Romania
 Politics of Romania
 List of political parties in Romania

References

External links
 Ioan Scurtu, Theodora Stănescu-Stanciu, Georgiana Margareta Scurtu, Istoria românilor între anii 1918–1940: IV. Partidele politice în primul deceniu interbelic (political programs of major parties in interwar Romania)

Romania
Politics of Romania